Williams Carmona is a Cuban painter. He was born in Havana, Cuba, in 1967. In the early 1990s he moved to Puerto Rico. He has works in a number of museums including the Museum of Latin American Art (MOLAA).

References

External links
 Facebook- Williams Carmona
 Nexos Magazine "Williams Carmona surrealismo caribeño"
 Cernuda Arte
 williamscarmona.com

Living people
1967 births
Artists from Havana
Cuban contemporary artists
Cuban painters
Cuban surrealist artists